Royal Consort Jeong of the Juksan An clan (Hangul: 정비 안씨, Hanja: 定妃 安氏; d. 1428) was the 5th wife of King Gongmin of Goryeo. She was also known with her Dharma name as Deok-wol and her new royal title as Princess Uihwa given by Taejo of Joseon in 1392.

She has been spoken of as a tragic figure among the women of the Later Goryeo dynasty:

Biography

Marriage and Palace life
In October 1366 (15th year reign of Gongmin), he took An as his Queen Consort as he didn't have any issue from his first-marriage. Then, in December, she become Jeong-Bi (정비, 定妃).

At this time, An's father, An Geuk-in (안극인) who was a comrade-in-chief, suggested to King Gongmin to suspend the construction of Queen Noguk's Yeongjeon (영전, 影殿), but An Geuk-in was removed from the office. Meanwhile, after her re-entry to the Palace, the King continued to commit misdeeds, such as forcing her to have sex with some of the young men from Jajewi (자제위, 子弟衛), but she adamantly refused. In May 1367, she and Consort Han went to Gorari (고라리, 高羅里) and watched Gyeoggu Game (격구놀).

In October 1372 (21st year of King Gongmin),  he selected some young and handsome men then, ordered Han-An (한안) and  Hong-Ryun (홍륜) from the Self-Defense Committee to rape his concubines. In this way, when a son was born from them, Gongmin will make that son become his. After this, An, Consort Han and others couldn't refuse this order and actually became pregnant. In 1374, King Gongmin was assassinated and King U ascended the throne.

During King U's reign
An then went out from the Palace and became a nun, then King U make her younger brother, An Suk-ro (안숙로)'s daughter, Lady An become his consort with the title Hyeon-Bi (현비, 賢妃). Even after King Gongmin's death, the court under King U's command still respect them and continued to provide their daily necessities, also the new King gave "Jahye Mansion" (자혜부, 慈惠府) as An's palace to lived. 

After King U's ascension to the throne succeed his father, it was said that U always taunted and harassed the Dowager Consort An by saying:
"Among my consorts, How can they have no one like you, Mother?""나의 후궁들은 어찌 모씨(母氏)와 같은 이가 없는가?"
Also, he often visited her mansion for two or three times a day, sometimes he went there again at night. Because of this, there were a rumor that An was harassed by King U own for attempted rape and strange rumors circulated. One day, while King U went to her palace again, An fell ill and didn't comb her hair, so they cancelled to meet and he instead meet her niece. Seeing this, people say:
"The Dowager Consort is trying to hide herself because she fear of ridicule from others.""정비가 남의 비웃음을 두려워하여 스스로 감추려 하는 것이다."
Beside this, there was an interpretation that King U, who was an orphan with no one to depend on, craved maternal love from his stepmother, Consort An.

During King Chang and King Gongyang's reign
In 1388, Yi Seong-gye (이성계) deposed King U from his position and as the oldest member in the palace, An agree this permission and choose the new candidate to succeed him, King Chang. Then, in December, all of palace maids was stopped to provide An's daily necessities.

One years later, Yi and Jeong Mong-ju (정몽주) once deposed King Chang and forced her to made King Gongyang to be crowned as the new one, she then dethroned King Chang and proclaimed a letter again stating that King Gongyang was crowned. Under King Gongyang's command, An then moved to "Gyeongsin Hall" (경신전, 敬愼殿) and honoured as Royal Grand Consort Jeongsuk-seonmyeong-gyeongsin-ikseong-yuhye (정숙선명경신익성유혜왕대비, 貞淑宣明敬信翼成柔惠王大妃).

In 1392, Yi and his allies forced the King Gongyang's dethronement and threatened An by forced her with a memorandum to allow the establishment of a new dynasty and handed over the national seal to him. As a result, the Goryeo dynasty who was overthrown for almost of 475 years fallen and the new Joseon dynasty was established.

Later life, death and funeral
An had a long-life until the end of Goryeo dynasty and the early Joseon dynasty that established by Yi Seong-gye (이성계). Later, on 7 August 1392 (4th year reign of King Taejo), she honoured as Princess Uihwa (의화궁주, 義和宮主) which she commonly known with that name during the Joseon dynasty. Later, on 14 May 1428 (1th year reign of King Sejong), she died and this was 36th years after Goryeo's fallen.

In Joseon Sillok, it was recorded that An was close to alcohol after being "Princess Uihwa" and she also spent most of her later-life with drank it after the fall of Goryeo dynasty. 6 days after her death, King Sejong prayed and took care of her funeral with the old system and used the Queen consort's rites manners (dressed her like the real queen). But, where's her tomb's location was unknown due there were no records about this.

Ancestry

In popular culture
Portrayed by Chaeryung in the 1983 KBS TV series Foundation of the Kingdom.
Portrayed by Han Young-sook in the 1983 MBC TV series 500 Years of Joseon: The King of Chudong Palace.
Portrayed by Han Eun-jin in the 1996-1998 KBS1 TV series Tears of the Dragon.
Portrayed by Seo Ji-seung in the 2005 MBC TV series Shin Don.
Portrayed by Kim Min-joo in the 2014 KBS1 TV series Jeong Do-jeon.
Portrayed by Kim Ji-hyun in the 2015–2016 SBS TV series Six Flying Dragons.
Portrayed by Kim Bo-mi in the 2021–2022 KBS1 TV series ''Taejong Yi Bang-won.

References

External links
 
Jeong-Bi An on Naver .
Jeong-bi An on Encykorea .

14th-century births
14th-century deaths
Royal consorts of the Goryeo Dynasty
14th-century Korean women
15th-century Korean women
People from Anseong